Gaddam Ranjith Reddy is an Indian politician and Businessman who is the current Member of Parliament in the Lok Sabha., representing Chevella constituency, Telangana. He is a member of the Telangana Rashtra Samithi.

References 

India MPs 2019–present
Lok Sabha members from Telangana
Living people
Telangana Rashtra Samithi politicians
1964 births